Cheyenne Takes Over is a 1947 American Western film directed by Ray Taylor and written by Arthur E. Orloff. The film stars Lash LaRue, Al St. John, Nancy Gates, George Chesebro, Lee Morgan and John Merton. The film was released on December 17, 1947, by Producers Releasing Corporation.

Plot

Cast          
Lash LaRue as Cheyenne Davis 
Al St. John as Fuzzy 
Nancy Gates as Fay Wilkins
George Chesebro as Wayne Dawson
Lee Morgan as Delhaven
John Merton as Bart McCord
Steve Clark as Sheriff
Bob Woodward as Anderson
Marshall Reed as Wayne Dawson
Budd Buster as Lem Boswick 
Carl Mathews as Messenger
Dee Cooper as Johnson
Buster Slaven as Bailey

References

External links
 

1947 films
American Western (genre) films
1947 Western (genre) films
Producers Releasing Corporation films
Films directed by Ray Taylor
American black-and-white films
1940s English-language films
1940s American films